Women's Murder Club is a series of mystery novels by American author James Patterson. The books are set in San Francisco and feature an ensemble of lead characters. 

The books have been adapted into a made for TV movie, a television series and several games.

Details
Set in San Francisco, the novels follow a group of women from different professions relating to investigating crime as they work together to solve murders. The series follows the women through their personal issues, including Lindsay Boxer's medical issues, marriage, and pregnancy. The main characters were originally Lindsay Boxer (police officer), Cindy Thomas (reporter), Claire Washburn (medical examiner), and Jill Bernhardt, but later in the series, defense attorney, Yuki Castellano, is introduced.

Every book except 7th Heaven and 10th Anniversary were #1 New York Times Best Sellers.

A New York Times article states that Patterson set The Women's Murder Club in San Francisco to gain more fans on the West Coast, where competitor John Grisham had been leading in book sales.

Co-authors
Patterson wrote the first novel, 1st to Die. Subsequent novels have been cowritten with Andrew Gross (2–3) and Maxine Paetro (4–23). Patterson has also written other books with both of these authors.

Books
 1st to Die
 2nd Chance
 3rd Degree
 4th of July
 The 5th Horseman
 The 6th Target
 7th Heaven
 The 8th Confession
 The 9th Judgment
 10th Anniversary
 11th Hour
 12th of Never
 Unlucky 13
 14th Deadly Sin
 15th Affair
 15.5 The Trial, novella
 16th Seduction
 16.5 The Medical Examiner, novella
 17th Suspect
 18th Abduction
 19th Christmas 
 The 20th Victim
 21st Birthday
 22 Seconds
 23rd Midnight

Television
The first book in the series, 1st to Die, had previously been a TV movie starring Tracy Pollan.

In 2007, the books were adapted to a television police procedural drama by the same name, which ran from October 12, 2007 through May 13, 2008 and starred Angie Harmon.

Games
Four games based on the books have been released for the PC – #1: Death in Scarlet, #2: A Darker Shade of Grey, #3: Twice in a Blue Moon, and #4: Little Black Lies. In addition, a video game called Women's Murder Club: Games of Passion has been released for the Nintendo DS.

References

External links 
 http://www.jamespatterson.com

 
Book series introduced in 2001